Trigona pallens, known as abelha-olho-de-vidro ("glass-eye bee") in Brazil, is a species of eusocial stingless bee in the family Apidae and tribe Meliponini.

References 

pallens
Hymenoptera of South America
Hymenoptera of Brazil
Insects described in 1798